WBB may refer to:

We Bare Bears
WVVA-DT2 callsign